Estefani ("Steffany") Garatejo-Barragán (born July 20, 1992 in Tolima) is a judoka from Colombia.

Bio
Steffany Garatejo was born in small village in Tolima but her family decided to move in capital city, Bogotá, due to violence in the region. They settled in the Sierra Morena district, Ciudad Bolívar, where Steffany started visiting Judo "bee" in her basic school at age 10. In the beginning, she was not sure if she wants to be a judoka. It changed when she found that judo is not just a sport.

She moved to sport club El Salitre. First years she spent most of her time with traveling because way from district where she lived and place where is her club takes almost 2 hours. She said, in an interview, that her typical day was waking up about 5 a.m. Before school doing some house works. 4-6 p.m. training in El Salitre then travelling at home where she was about 9 p.m. Her mother always waited her and they together climbed up to hill where was their house.

This traveling ended due to her gains in National Championships, where she always took first place. She got a room in Deportel hotel which is paid by The Colombian Institute of Sport. She spends weekends with her family. Her younger brother wants to be a taekwondist.

Steffany likes walking in park with ice cream. Her favorite food is chicken and of course ice cream. Her sport wishing is participating at Olympic Games and in personal life she wants to be a coroner because of CSI: Crime Scene Investigation.

Judo
Steffany's biggest success is winning gold medal at Pan American Judo Championships in 2009. She was the youngest participant from all 4 girls who competed in the "super extra-lightweight category. She said after championships that she felt like little girl against them. She was very nervous but when her trainer Wilfredo Duardo told her that she will lose nothing then she decided to beat all of them. She did it and won gold.

Her trainer Wilfredo Duardo said about Steffany that she is very specific judoka. She has temperament and aggression on tatami but outside tatami she is responsible, tractable, hardworking. She has everything to be very successful sportsman.

Achievements

References

External links
 
 Facebook (logged)

1992 births
Living people
Colombian female judoka
South American Games silver medalists for Colombia
South American Games medalists in judo
Competitors at the 2010 South American Games
People from Tolima Department
21st-century Colombian women